The Plaza de Armas (literally Weapons Square, but better translated as Parade Square or parade ground) is the name for Latin American main squares. In the central region of Mexico this space is known as El Zócalo and in Central America as Parque Central (Central Park). While some large cities have both a Plaza de Armas and a Plaza Mayor, in most cities those are two names for the same place.

Most cities constructed by the Spanish conquistadores were designed in a standard military fashion, based on a grid pattern taken from the Roman castrum, of which one block would be left vacant to form the Plaza de Armas.  It is often surrounded by governmental buildings, churches, and other structures of cultural or political significance. The name derives from the fact that this would be a refuge in case of an attack upon the city, from which arms would be supplied to the defenders.

Main examples of Plaza de Armas in the Hispanic world
Plaza de Armas of Guatemala
Plaza de Armas of Arequipa, Peru
Plaza de Armas of Ayacucho, Peru
Plaza de Armas of Cajamarca, Peru
Plaza de Armas of Cusco, Peru
Plaza de Armas of Huánuco, Peru
Plaza de Armas of Ambo, Peru
Plaza de Armas of Guadalajara, Mexico
Plaza de Armas of Havana, Cuba
Plaza de Armas of Lima, Peru
Plaza de Armas of Manila, Philippines
Plaza de Armas of Pisco, Peru
Plaza de Armas of Puerto Vallarta, Mexico
Plaza de Armas of San Antonio, United States
Plaza de Armas of San Juan, Puerto Rico
Plaza de Armas of Santiago, Chile
Plaza de Armas of Trujillo, Peru
Plaza de Armas of Asunción, Paraguay
Plaza de Armas of Santo Domingo, República Dominicana

Public transit stations
Plaza de Armas metro station in Santiago, Chile
Plaza de Armas (bus station) in Seville, Spain

See also
 Place-d'Armes (disambiguation), French equivalent

References 

Town squares
Parade grounds